This is a list of  story writers in Arabic and short story writers from Arab world.

A 

 Zain Abdul-Hadi
 Samir abdul-Fattah
 Mohammad Al-Azab
 Yosuf al-Alamy
 Osama Alomar
 Alaa Al Aswany
 Muhammad Aladdin
 Tawfiq Yusuf 'Awwad
 Fatimah Yousif al-Ali
Wasino Al-Araj
Ibtisam Abdallah
Rabi' Alamoddin
Leila Abu al-Ela
Lana Abdel Rahman

B 

 Liana Badr
 Ali Bader
 Idris Ali
 Ibrahim Aslan
 Salwa Bakr
 Mohammad al-Bisatie
 Latifa Baka
 Abdul-Majid Ben Jalloun
 Mohammed Berrada
 Ahmed Bouzfour
 Hassan Blasim
Ya'qub Bilbul
Badryah El-Bishr
Issa J. Boullata
Khalil Beidas
Abdallah Salim Bawazir

C 

 Mohamed Choukri

D 

 Izzat Darwaza
Jabbour Douaihy
Nasser al-Dhaheri
Hassan Daoud

E 
 Tarek Emam
 Mansour Eid

G 

 Hamdi Abu Golayyel
 Ali Ghadeer
Abdelkrim Ghallab

H 

 Emile Habibi
 Rosa Yaseen Hasan
 Muhammad Husayn Haykal
 Tawfiq al-Hakim
 Yahya Haqqi
 Renée Hayek
 Abdelhamid ben Hadouga
Anwar Hamed
Jokha al-Harthi
 Yasmeen Hanoosh

I 

 Yusuf Idris

J 
 Kahlil Gibran
 Sara al-Jarwan
 Laila al-Juhani

K 

 Ghassan Kanafani
 Edwar al-Kharrat
 Driss El Khouri
 Umaima al-Khamis
 Ziad Khaddash

L 
 Mohammed Lotfy Gomaa

M 

 Rabai al-Madhoun
 Naguib Mahfouz
 Mohamed Makhzangi
 Mohamed Mustagab
 Mohammad Al Murr
 Hassan Mutlak
 Mustafa Lutfi al-Manfaluti
 Muhammad Abdallah Muthanna
 Ali El-Maak
Yousef Al-Mohaimeed
Muhammed Abu Maatouk
Razan Naiem Almoghrabi
Bashir Mufti
Fatin al-Murr

N 

 Nesma Idris
Emily Nasrallah
Jamal Naji

O 
 Laila al-Ouhaydib
Omar Ben Salem

Q 

 Mohamed Mansi Qandil

R 

 Mahmoud al-Rimawy
 Somaya Ramadan
 Yusuf Abu Rayya
 Muhsin al-Ramli
 Mubarak Rabi
Mohamed Said Raihani
Alifa Rifaat

S 
 Habib Selmi
 Mekkawi Said
 Ibtihal Salem
 Driss Seghir
 Abdelhak Serhane
 Ghada al-Samman
 Anton Shammas
 Habib Abdulrab Sarori
 Hanan al-Shaykh
 Mohammad Shaheen
Salah Abu Seif
Saud Alsanousi
Alawiya Sobh
Amina Said

T 

 Miral al-Tahawy
 Sahar Tawfiq
 May Telmissany
 Zakaria Tamer
 Ibtisam Ibrahim Teresa
May Telmissany

W 
 Dima Wannous

Y 
 Samar Yazbek
 Yahya Yakhlif

Z 

 Amina Zaydan
 Mohamed Zafzaf
Ibrahim al-Zaarur

See also
Arabic literature
Arabic short story

Arabic short story writers